Abdoulaye Hissène is a Central African warlord, general in the Popular Front for the Rebirth of Central African Republic (FPRC), former minister of youth, sanctioned by international institutions for committing multiple war crimes.

Life 
He was born on 1 January 1967 in Akourousoulba village near the border with Chad. He is a Muslim and belongs to the Runga ethnic group. His father was an environmental guard responsible for supervising protected areas in the region. When he was young, Hissène's father taught him and his siblings hunting and use of weapons. According to other sources his father was Abba Adoum Kette, influential diamond collector from Bria. Another his son was reportedly Mahamet Saleh. In the 1990s and 2000s, Hissène pursued a career in the mineral trade like his uncle. He worked as a trader of diamonds and gold for the Central African company SODIAM. After accumulating multiple debts he fled to Chad in 2009 to avoid paying them back. In his 40s, he started selling luxury cars, during which he formed business connections with the entourage of president of Chad, Idriss Déby, and influential businessmen. Using fake Chadian IDs, he opened two bank accounts that he used between 2009 and 2010, one in Société Générale and the other in the United Bank of Africa (UBA) in the capital of Chad, N’djamena.

Civil war 
In 2009 he joined Central African rebel group Convention of Patriots for Justice and Peace (CPJP). He declared himself president of CPJP in 2011. From 2009 to 2012 he obtained fortune from diamond trade, with his fighters responsible for multiple war crimes. In August 2012 he received ministerial post as a part of peace deal with the government. From March 2013 to January 2014 he served as a youth and sports minister under Djotodia presidency. From February to August 2014 he served as a minister and presidential adviser for youth under Samba-Panza presidency. In June 2014 he was nominated first counselor to the Popular Front for the Rebirth of Central African Republic (FPRC), new ex-Seleka group.

In September 2015 he ordered his fighters to kill a 17-year old Muslim boy in Bangui and spread rumors that Anti-balaka did it to instigate violence in the capital. He ordered his fighters to shoot at people participating in referendum on 17 December 2015, killing at least five of them. On 15 March 2016 he was arrested by police before his fighters forced his release. On 19 June 2016 fighters led by him and Gaye kidnapped five police officers in Bangui.

On 12 August 2016 he decided to escape PK5 district. Together with Haroun Gaye and Hamit Tidjani they painted seven vehicles white in order to resemble UN vehicles. 35 heavily armed ex-Seleka fighter left in total. While passing through PK12 checkpoint soldier fired at them killing on fighter. In Damara they again clashed with soldiers. One fighter who fell off vehicle was killed by Anti-balaka. In Sibut MINUSCA stopped them. They abandoned their vehicles. MINUSCA arrested 11 fighters, but Gaye and Hissène managed to escape on foot. In early September 2016 he arrived N'Délé together with Gaye. From there the group supposedly travelled to Siki Kedi and N’Da in Vakaga prefecture where they met with Noureddine Adam, before going to Bria to attend ex-Séléka General Assembly. In November 2016 during clashes in Bria he ordered groups of militiamen to kill Fula civilians. He stoked ethnic tensions, encouraging Anti-balaka fighters to attack UPC armed group. In 2019 he married daughter of sultan of Birao.

In 2020 he refused to join Coalition of Patriots for Change. In February 2021 he blocked a weapon shipment designated for CPC fighters.

References 

African warlords
People of the Central African Republic Civil War
1967 births
Specially Designated Nationals and Blocked Persons List
Living people
People from Bamingui-Bangoran
Government ministers of the Central African Republic